Türisalu Cliff is a cliff in Türisalu, Estonia.

Türisalu cliff has accumulated a negative reputation as a "popular" place for suicides, especially among younger people.

References

Harku Parish
Cliffs of Estonia
Landforms of Harju County
Tourist attractions in Harju County
Baltic Klint